Yukarin may refer to:

 Yukari Fukui,  a Japanese voice actress and former radio DJ
 Yukari Tamura, a Japanese voice actress and singer